Dark of the Moon may refer to:

Dark of the Moon (play), by American playwrights William Berney and Howard Richardson
"Dark of the Moon" (The Unit), a television episode
Dark of the Moon: Poems of Fantasy and the Macabre, a 1947 anthology edited by August Derleth
Dark of the Moon, a 1968 mystery novel by John Dickson Carr
 Dark of the Moon, a 1985 fantasy novel by P. C. Hodgell
Dark of the Moon, a 2005 novel by John Sandford
Dark of the Moon, a 2009 paranormal romance novel in the Dark Guardian series
Transformers: Dark of the Moon, a 2011 film

See also
 Dark Side of the Moon (disambiguation)
 Transformers: Dark of the Moon (disambiguation)